The June 16, 2009 storm was an unusually strong derecho containing vivid lightning and spawning several tornadoes. The worst of the damage was primarily in South Central Kentucky. 

This large storm system would later be classified as a derecho by the National Weather Service. It was a fast moving storm system moving across Kentucky, west to east, damaging several counties with 90 mph straight line winds in some areas, with heavy rain. There were many warnings issued during the derecho including tornado warnings.

See also
List of derecho events

External links
 NWS page for June 16th, 2009 storms
 Photos of the damage in Glasgow, KY (Barren County)
 Glasgow Daily Times News Article 1
 Glasgow Daily Times News Article 2
 Glasgow Daily Times News Article 3

2009 meteorology
2009 natural disasters in the United States
Derechos in the United States
Natural disasters in Kentucky
2009 in Kentucky
June 2009 events in the United States